José Luis Caballero (21 June 1955 – 14 January 2021) was a Mexican footballer. He competed in the men's tournament at the 1976 Summer Olympics and won a gold medal in football at the 1975 Pan American Games.

References

External links
 

1955 births
2021 deaths
Mexican footballers
Mexico international footballers
Olympic footballers of Mexico
Footballers at the 1976 Summer Olympics
Place of birth missing
Association football midfielders
Pan American Games gold medalists for Mexico
Pan American Games medalists in football
Footballers at the 1975 Pan American Games
Medalists at the 1975 Pan American Games